Cheshmeh Sard (also known as Cheshmeh Sardeh, Cheshmeh Sardeh-ye Nūr Morad, and Darreh Nūr Morad) is a village in Teshkan Rural District, Chegeni District, Dowreh County, Lorestan Province, Iran. At the 2006 census, its population was 141, in 28 families.

References 

Towns and villages in Dowreh County